Ken Rosewall was the defending champion but lost in the semifinals to Arthur Ashe.

Stan Smith won the singles title of the 1973 World Championship Tennis Finals after a 6–3, 6–3, 4–6, 6–4 in the final against Ashe.

Seeds
A champion seed is indicated in bold text while text in italics indicates the round in which that seed was eliminated.

  Stan Smith (champion)
  Roger Taylor (quarterfinals)
  Marty Riessen (quarterfinals)
  Rod Laver (semifinals)
  Roy Emerson (quarterfinals)
  Arthur Ashe (final)
  Ken Rosewall (semifinals)
  John Alexander (quarterfinals)

Draw

References

External links
 ATP draw

Singles